The 2009 Four Continents Figure Skating Championships an international figure skating competition in the 2008–09 season. It was held at the Pacific Coliseum in Vancouver, Canada on February 2–8. Medals were awarded in the disciplines of men's singles, ladies' singles, pair skating, and ice dancing. The compulsory dance was the Finnstep.

Notes
Skaters who reached the age of 15 by July 1, 2008 were eligible to compete. Unlike the other three ISU championships, each nation was allowed three entries in each discipline, regardless of its skaters' performance in the previous year's championships. The corresponding competition for European skaters was the 2009 European Figure Skating Championships.

This event served as the Olympic test event for figure skating for the 2010 Vancouver Olympic Winter Games although the rink was NHL-sized.

Schedule
(Local Time, UTC−8)

 Wednesday, February 4
 13:00 Ice dancing – Compulsory dance
 15:15 Pairs – Short program
 17:30 Opening ceremony
 18:15 Ladies – Short program
 Thursday, February 5
 11:00 Ice dancing – Original dance
 13:35 Pairs – Free skating
 16:30 Men – Short program
 Friday, February 6
 13:45 Ice dancing – Free dance
 18:00 Ladies – Free skating
 Saturday, February 7
 10:45 Men – Free skating
 Sunday, February 8
 12:00: Gala exhibition

Results

Men

Ladies

Kim Yuna set a new world record for the short program.

Pairs

Ice dancing

References

External links

 Official site
 
 Competitors list
 

Four Continents Figure Skating Championships
Four Continents
Four Continents
Four Continents